Clare Johnson is an American writer and artist from Seattle, Washington.
Her work deals with the parallel themes of memory and loss.

Art 

Technically trained at Brown University, Providence, USA, Slade School of Fine Art, London, England and Central St Martins College of Art and Design, London, England her intricate ink drawings deal obsessively with the frontier between solitude and loneliness, comfort and disconsolation.  The work was originally inspired by imagery from nightly drawings on post-it notes. Johnson's drawings have been described as "intimate both in content and nature. Exploring personal illness and anxieties, her work is much more than art therapy, but a delicate, illustrative analysis of vulnerability, fear and the looming dangers of life both physical and metaphorical."

Johnson's paintings are exhibited on unframed, stretched canvas, which, by avoiding the smug completeness of a frame, reminds the viewer that pictures miss as much as they reveal. On the subject of painting, she writes "I object to the belief that a painting should always be a statement about painting itself. If one has to extract such a statement from my paintings, it would be simply that paintings should relate to something significant about life, something worth spending that time on. They should be for anyone - for an unrestricted potential audience, rather than an elite group of experts."

She has won numerous awards for both her art and her writing, including the Michael S. Harper Poetry Prize in 2004. She has been published in Blithe House Quarterly and Cranky Literary Journal, for which she was briefly an assistant editor. Her artwork has been exhibited at Lauderdale House, the Jerwood Space and The Bargehouse Gallery in London. Johnson's 35 drawing piece, My Parents Told Me to Stay Calm, which formed part of the Deep Inspiration benefit for Asthma UK in 2007 received special mention by the organisers, including Gavin Turk. 
In 2009, exhibitions include the Oxford Contemporary at Ovada (7 February to 21 March 2009) and Will I Live Here When I Grow Up? a solo show at The North Wall Gallery, Oxford (11–29 May 2009).

Johnson discussed how contemporary music has informed her writing in a talk for the University of Cambridge Festival of Ideas at Kettle's Yard, in November 2008.

Activism 

Johnson has been a campaigner for gay, lesbian and transgender rights since high school and at university advocated for reform of the residence hall criteria, arguing that the current male/ female option was discriminatory and that insufficient attention was being given to issues like safe bathrooms for transgender students, who are often at high risk of assault in gender-specific zones. In 2009, Johnson taught a children's stories class for Tower Hamlets Council Children's Services as part of LGBT History month.

References

Artists from Seattle
Writers from Seattle
Brown University alumni
Alumni of the Slade School of Fine Art
Alumni of Central Saint Martins
Living people
Year of birth missing (living people)